The Dunquin Group is a Silurian lithostratigraphic group (a sequence of rock strata) in the Dingle peninsula, Munster, Ireland. The name is derived from the village of Dunquin (Irish: Dun Chaoin) where the strata are exposed within an inlier on hillsides and in coastal sections at the extreme western end of the peninsula.

Lithology and stratigraphy 
The Group comprises siltstones, slates and a variety of extrusive igneous rocks from the Croaghmarin, Drom Point, Mill Cove, Clogher Head, Ferriter's Cove, Foilnamahagh and Coosglass Slate formations of Silurian age. The siltstones are frequently fossiliferous.

References 

Geologic groups of Europe
Geologic formations of Ireland
Silurian System of Europe
Silurian Ireland
Siltstone formations
Slate formations